Gymnázium Ľudovíta Jaroslava Šuleka Komárno is a high school in Komárno, Slovakia. The building was constructed 60 years ago and has been remodelled several times. The school is successful in helping its students pass the university entry exam.

External links 
 About the Sulek High School 

Gymnasiums in Slovakia
Education in Slovakia
Schools in Slovakia